Grand'Landes is a commune in the Vendée department in the Pays de la Loire region in western France.

See also
Communes of the Vendée department

References

External links

Current weather conditions

Communes of Vendée